Dan Fishback (born November 4, 1981 in Washington D.C.) is an American performance artist, playwright and singer-songwriter who is heavily associated with that city's anti-folk movement.

Life and work
Since 2003, Fishback has been performing and writing in New York City. His work includes overt, radical politics and humor as well as experimental and musical theater, punk rock, twee-pop, and solo performances based on monologues. Fishback is the Helix Queer Performance Network's director.

Theatre 

In 2011, he performed a multimedia solo piece called  thirtynothing  which combines biographical information and content about gay artists who have died. According to Time Out New York, The Material World is about "socialist Jews in the 1920s who share a house with Madonna, Britney Spears and a modern gay slacktivist." The Village Voice compared the historical complexity of You Will Experience Silence to the plays of Tony Kushner.

Music 

As a performing songwriter, Fishback started in the East Village's anti-folk scene. His band, Cheese On Bread, released two full-length albums, "Maybe Maybe Maybe Baby" (2004) and "The Search for Colonel Mustard" (2007), the latter of which was re-issued in Japan in 2010 on Moor Works Records. As a solo artist, Fishback has released several recordings, including "Sweet Chastity" (2005, produced by César Alvarez of The Lisps), "Strange Little Faggots" (2006), Calendar Boys (2008), and "The Mammal Years" (2012, produced by Casey Holford). It featured contributions from Cheese on Bread guitarist Dibson T. Hoffweiler and Pansy Division Drummer Luis Illades. Fishback also fronted a hard rock band, The Faggots, which prompted controversy in the press.

Fishback released a full-length solo album, Sweet Chastity (Luv-a-Lot Records), in 2005, followed by an EP of cover songs, Strange Little Faggots, in 2006, and Calendar Boys (Off-Stage Fright Productions, 2008).  

In 2007 Fishback recorded an audio performance-art piece called Faggotssaywhat? for the anti-folk compilation album Anticomp Folkilation.

In September 2006, Fishback was the subject of a piece on the PBS newsmagazine program In The Life.

Other work 

Fishback was part of the punk dance troupe Underthrust, which collaborated with singer-songwriter Kimya Dawson on several performances and videos. His essay "Times Are Changing, Reb Tevye" appeared in the anthology Mentsh: On Being Jewish & Queer (Alyson Books, 2004), and was followed by several self-produced zines, including A Very Small Hole (2005) and What Have They Done To You? (2008). His visual installation, "Pen Pals," was featured in the 2011 Soho exhibition of the Pop-Up Museum of Queer History, for which he later served on the Selection Committee. His essay, Times Are Changing, Reb Tevye, was published in Mentsh: On Being Jewish and Queer (Alyson Books, 2004).

References

1981 births
20th-century American Jews
American performance artists
Queer writers
American LGBT musicians
Living people
21st-century American dramatists and playwrights
Queer men
American LGBT dramatists and playwrights
21st-century American Jews
21st-century LGBT people